Reşid is a Turkish name and may refer to:

 Koca Mustafa Reşid Pasha (1800–1858), Ottoman statesman and chief architect of the Tanzimat reforms
 Reşid Mehmed Pasha (1780–1839), Ottoman general and Grand Vizier

See also
 Rashid (name)

Turkish masculine given names